Clucas is a surname of Manx origin, derived from "Mac Lucas", meaning "son of Luke". It may refer to:

Ben Clucas (born 1984), British racing driver
George Frederick Clucas (1870–1937), Manx politician
Humphrey Clucas (born 1941), British composer
Sir Kenneth Clucas (1921–2010), English civil servant
Matthew Clucas (born 1978), Australian rules footballer
Sam Clucas (born 1990), English footballer
Seanan Clucas (born 1990), Northern Irish footballer

Manx-language surnames
Patronymic surnames